Holdingham is a hamlet in the civil parish and built-up area of Sleaford, Lincolnshire. It is bisected by Lincoln Road (B1518) which joins the A17 and A15 roads immediately north of the settlement; those roads connect it to Lincoln, Newark, Peterborough and King's Lynn. Sleaford railway station is on the Nottingham to Skegness (via Grantham) and Peterborough to Lincoln Lines.

Prehistoric and Romano-British artefacts have been uncovered around Holdingham. There was an early and middle Saxon settlement, which appears to have disappeared in the 9th century. The current settlement's Old English name suggests a pre-conquest origin, though it was not mentioned in the Domesday Book and appears to have formed part of the Bishop of Lincoln's manor of New Sleaford. Holdingham probably functioned as the agricultural focus of the manor, while New Sleaford (0.9 miles or 1.5 km south) was encouraged to expand as a commercial centre. The land was ceded to the Crown in 1540 and was acquired by Robert Carre in 1559; it passed through his family and then, through marriage, to the Earls (later Marquesses) of Bristol, who owned almost all of the land. Enclosed in 1794, it remained a small, primarily agricultural settlement well into the 20th century.

The late 20th century brought substantial change. Holdingham Roundabout was built immediately north of the hamlet in 1975 as part of the A17 bypass around Sleaford; the roundabout also accommodated the A15 bypass which opened in 1993. After Lord Bristol sold the agricultural land around the hamlet, major residential development began; private housing estates were completed either side of Lincoln Road between Sleaford and Holdingham in the 1990s and early 2000s. The hamlet thereby merged into Sleaford's urban area, functioning more like a suburb of the town. Further developments have taken place in the 2010s.

Holdingham had its own chapel in the Middle Ages, but this was abandoned c. 1550; its site has not been identified securely. It has had a public house since at least the early 19th century. It now has petrol filling stations on the roundabout and Lincoln Road, as well as fast food restaurants, a hotel, a café and a nursing home – all opened since the middle of the 20th century. The nearest schools and other public services are in Sleaford. The hamlet was anciently part of the parish of New Sleaford; in 1866, the civil parish of Holdingham was established but in 1974 was merged into Sleaford civil parish. The hamlet now lends its name to a ward in North Kesteven, although the boundaries differ somewhat from those of the old parish. It had a population of 2,774 in 2011.

Geography

Topography 
Holdingham is a settlement 0.9 miles (1.5 km) north of Sleaford, a market town in the North Kesteven district of Lincolnshire. The old hamlet clusters around and is bisected by Lincoln Road (B1518) immediately below Holdingham Roundabout which connects Lincoln Road to the A17 and A15 roads. A stream called Field Beck (also known as Holdingham Beck) runs east−west through the hamlet within a narrow, shallow valley. To the south of the hamlet is modern housing, which creates a contiguous urban area with Sleaford.

Holdingham lies between approximately 20 and 30 meters above sea level. The old hamlet on the west side of Lincoln Road is underlain by Jurassic mudstone belonging to the Blisworth Clay Formation, a group of sedimentary rocks formed 165–168 million years ago; this forms a narrow outcrop along Field Beck's shallow valley. The bedrock under the rest of the area (including the modern housing developments) is Cornbrash limestone belonging to the Great Oolite Group of Jurassic rocks formed 161–168 million years ago. The soil belongs to the Aswarby series of brown, calcareous earth. It is free-draining, loamy and lime-rich, suited for growing cereals and grasses but classified as a nitrate vulnerable zone.

Parish and ward boundaries 
Holdingham also gave its name to a civil parish which existed between 1866 (when it was separated from the ancient parish of New Sleaford) and 1974, when it was merged into the current successor civil parish of Sleaford. The parish boundaries, which contained the hamlet and adjacent fields and farm houses, were finally amended in 1882.

Since at least 1999, Holdinham has also given its name to an electoral ward (Sleaford Holdingham) in the district of North Kesteven. The ward's boundaries, as fixed in 2007, differ from those of the old civil parish. As well as the hamlet, they incorporate all of the land bounded by Lincoln Road, the A17 and the railway track; this includes the Jubilee Grove and Woodside Avenue housing estates, Sleaford Wood, Poplar Business Park and Sleaford Enterprise Park, which sit on land outside the former parish boundaries. The ward boundaries also include land to the north of the A17 and west of Lincoln Road which were included in the former parish (including the modern Stokes Drive, Peterborough Way, Furlong Way and Whittle Road housing estates). However, the ward boundaries exclude most of the land south of the line between The Drove and Sumner's Plantation which had been in the former parish.

Climate
The British Isles experience a temperate, maritime climate with warm summers and cool winters. Data from the weather station nearest to Holdingham (at Cranwell, 3 miles north-west), shows that the average daily mean temperature is 9.8 °C (49.6 °F); this fluctuates from a peak of 16.9 °C (62.4 °F) in July to 3.9 °C (39.0 °F) in January. The average high temperature is 13.7 °C (56.7 °F), though the monthly average varies from 6.7 °C (44.1 °F) in January and December to 21.8 °C (71.2 °F) in July; the average low is 5.9 °C (42.6 °F) which reaches its lowest in February at 0.8 °C (33.4 °F) and its highest in July and August at 12.0 °C (53.6 °F).

History

Prehistoric, Roman and early Saxon settlements 
A Bronze Age flint scraper and two pottery sherds from the same period have been uncovered at Holdingham. Lincoln Road, connecting Sleaford and Lincoln, may have Roman origins, although the stretch between Sleaford and Brauncewell (via Holdingham) could be prehistoric. East of the settlement is a suspected Roman villa and skeletons have been uncovered with Romano-British pottery to the south-west; coins and pottery recovered in archaeological investigations date between 2nd and 4th centuries AD. Along with ditches and gullies, the remains of early and middle Anglo-Saxon enclosures and post-built buildings have been uncovered east of Holdingham Roundabout (on the sites where the McDonald's restaurant and the Furlong Way housing development have since been built); finds included sherds of pottery, much of it produced locally though some from as far afield as Leicestershire. Animal bones, loom weights, querns, metal-working waste, remains of crops and domestic waste were also uncovered. The site dwindled in size and was "largely abandoned" in the 9th century; it probably reverted to agricultural use and it is possible that the settlement shifted to the present location of the hamlet on the western side of Lincoln Road. Its decline may also reflect the growing importance of Sleaford.

Later farming village 

The word Holdingham derives from the personal name Hald and the Old English words -inga and -ham, together meaning "Homestead of Hald's family or followers", as A. D. Mills puts it. The place name scholars Kenneth Cameron and John Ingsley make him Halda and his followers the Haldingas. This implies a pre-conquest origin, though the earliest record of the name does not occur until c. 1202. Although not mentioned in the Domesday Book, it was probably a dependent part of the Bishop of Lincoln's manor in Sleaford. In the mid-12th century, the Bishops of Lincoln encouraged trade at New Sleaford (as it became known); they granted it limited liberties and burgage tenure. An estate survey of 1258, however, shows that tenants in Holdingham held both tofts and bovates, implying that it remained a centre of demesne farming. The arrangement of the manor's open fields around the settlement add credence to this, suggesting, as local historian Simon Pawley wrote, that Holdingham was "the agricultural focus" of the Bishop's estate at Sleaford. By 1334, the settlement was valued at £2 16s. 3¼d. It remained a part of the Bishop's estate until Bishop Holbeach alienated it to the Crown in 1540. Mary I granted it to Edward Clinton, Lord Clinton and later Earl of Lincoln, who sold it to Robert Carre in 1559. It passed through his family and then, by marriage, to the Earls (later Marquesses) of Bristol.

In medieval and early modern times, the settlement was arranged into closes. St Mary's Chapel served the inhabitants from at least 1340 (when it is first recorded) until around 1550, around which time it fell into ruin. Its location remains unknown. To the west, the land south of Newark Road was part of the Anna (or Annah) Common. The earliest surviving map of Holdingham dates from 1776 and shows the arrangement of closes, surrounded by open fields (Town Furlong to the south, Waze Furlong to the far east and Walnut Tree Furlong to the east, immediately beneath the row of small closes that lined the drove to Sleaford Moor). In 1794 the Marquess of Bristol enclosed the open fields; he had by far the largest stake in them, at c. 1,000 acres, against the combined 96 acres divided between 7 other men. In order to compensate inhabitants with grazing rights, Lord Bristol allocated them land on Sleaford Moor, to the east of Holdingham. The Vicar of Sleaford was allocated a farm on the Anna to compensate for the loss of his tithes.

In 1825, Holdingham had eighteen houses and a number of tenements for the poor; together, these housed 25 families. The Jolly Scotchman inn has existed in the hamlet since at least 1826. Although anciently a hamlet in the parish of New Sleaford, Holdingham appointed its own parish officers in the early 19th century. In 1866, Holdingham was reorganised into its own civil parish (though the ecclesiastical parish boundaries remained unchanged); at the next census, it had 27 inhabited houses, 31 families and a population of 143. Over the next seventy years, the parish population stayed fairly static before declining slightly; there were only 75 people living in 22 houses in 1951.

Modern developments 

A petrol filling station had been built on Lincoln Road, just south of the hamlet, by at least the 1960s; in 1972, this was taken over by Hockmeyer Motors, who later replaced it with a modern filling station. In 1973–75, Sleaford's eastern bypass was built, which included the construction of Holdingham Roundabout immediately north of the hamlet and at the intersection of the A15, Lincoln Road and the A17. In 1990, Trusthouse Forte UK were granted permission to build a hotel, services and a petrol station on a site on the north-west; Little Chef opened there in 1991, joined by Travelodge. The western bypass was added in 1993, which diverted the A15 around Sleaford from Holdingham Roundabout. Planning permission was approved in 2001 for a McDonald's restaurant on the site to the south-east.

Residential development also took place in the late 20th century. After the 1930s, Sleaford's urban area had encroached northwards along either side of Lincoln Road: the private North Parade development on the west was built in the 1930s and the interwar and post-war social housing on the east both ended near Holdingham's parish boundaries. The Marquess of Bristol still owned almost all of the agricultural land in the parish before the 1960s, but then began selling it off. By 1970, suburban housing on St Denys Avenue had been erected, immediately north of the North Parade estate and within the parish boundaries. The parish was merged with New Sleaford, Old Sleaford and Quarrington in 1974 to form the current Sleaford civil parish. On the eastern side of Lincoln Road, the Woodside Avenue estate had been built by the late 1980s, south-west of the old parish boundaries. In 1987, the district council designated portions of land between St Denys' Avenue, Durham Avenue, the Woodside Avenue estate and Holdingham for residential housing, effectively making Holdingham part of Sleaford's contiguous urban area. These lands have all been developed. Planning permission was granted in 1987–91 for private housing developments off Durham Avenue on the east of Lincoln Road totalling 212 homes and most of the estate was complete by 1996. Full planning permission was granted to developers for the construction of 174 houses on the west side of Lincoln Road in 1991 and 1995, and these houses were mostly finished by late 2001. As the local historian Simon Pawley remarked in the late 1990s, Holdingham had "begun to look more like a suburb of Sleaford than a village in its own right" as a result of these developments.

More followed. In 2008 Nottingham Community Housing Association was granted permission to build 97 houses on the greenfield site east of McDonalds, which was largely complete by 2011. Outline planning permission was granted to a private house-builder in 2014 for the erection of 290 houses and a 70-bed nursing home on land to the east of this development; the number was reduced to 286 three years later. The care home opened in 2018. The rest of the housing development, known as Holdingham Grange, was partially complete as of 2019. The Sleaford Masterplan, produced in 2011 for North Kesteven District Council, designated large tracts of land between the existing housing and the A15 bypass as potential housing sites for the period to 2036. In 2017, the Drove Landowners Partnership submitted plans for 1,400 homes, two schools, a hotel, a community centre and shops to be built on this land, spanning from Holdingham to The Drove; as of 2020, these plans are awaiting approval by the planning authority.

Economy

Context 
The Sleaford built-up area is the urban centre of the North Kesteven district, and one of the district's centres of employment. Many of North Kesteven's residents also commute out of the district to work, including at Lincoln, Grantham and Newark-on-Trent.

Sleaford includes one of the district council's three "strategic employment locations", Sleaford Enterprise Park, which lies within the Sleaford Holdingham ward. According to Google Maps, the enterprise park in 2020 housed at least 40 businesses, including a brewer, furniture maker, tarpaulin manufacturer, 12 retailers (including five vehicle dealerships), 4 wholesalers, a plant hire outlet, a publisher, three leisure services, eight skilled trades (including six vehicle repair shops), and other services. The Sleaford Household Waste Recycling Centre is also on the site. North of the Enterprise Park are outlets housing two wholesalers, a tool manufacturer, an electrician, a training centre and an energy supplier. Immediately adjacent but outside of the ward boundaries are the other business parks and industrial estates which collectively house over 60 more companies, including retailers, wholesalers, services and manufacturing concerns.

Nevertheless, the public sector is the predominant form of employment; public administration, education and healthcare collectively account for 29% of the workforce. The Sleaford conurbation is also situated near the Royal Air Force bases at Cranwell, Digby and Waddington which are also major employers in the district.

According to a local authority report, Sleaford is also "the main retail, service and employment centre for people living in the town and in the surrounding villages", which includes Holdingham. Retail, services and distribution make up 22% of the town's workforce.

Workforce (Sleaford Holdingham ward) 
According to the 2011 census, 73.8% of the Sleaford Holdingham ward's residents aged between 16 and 74 were economically active, compared with 69.9% for all of England. 66.1% were in employment, compared with 62.1% nationally. The proportion of full-time employment is relatively high, at 44.3% (against 38.6% nationally). 14.7% of residents in this age range were employed part-time. A further 7.1% were self-employed; 5% of people were economically active but unemployed and 2.6% were full-time students. The proportion of retirees is 14.1% compared with 13.7% nationally. The proportion of long-term sick or disabled is 2.9%, lower than England's 4%; 2.3% of people were long-term unemployed, compared with 1.7% in all of England.

The 2011 census revealed that the most common industry that the ward's residents worked in was wholesale and retail trade and the repair of motor vehicles (15.3%, comparable with England's population as a whole at 15.9%). Public administration and defence is overrepresented among the ward's population, account for 14.3% of workers compared with 5.9% nationally. The proportion of people working in manufacturing (12.1%) is also higher than in England as whole (8.8%). Human health and social work activities accounted for 11.6%, slightly less than the 12.4% nationally. No other sectors accounted for more than 10%, with the next highest being construction (7.9%), education (7.3%), accommodation and food services (7.1%) and transport and storage (5.7%). Professional and scientific activities were under-represented (at 3.8% against 6.7% nationally). The proportion of people working in financial services (1.1%) was a quarter of the rate nationally.

The census also showed that 9.3% of the working population were managers, directors or senior officials and 10.8% were professionals, both lower than the figures for England as a whole (10.9% and 17.5% respectively); 12.4% were associate professionals or people employed in technical occupations, roughly in line with the national figure. A further 9.6% of people were in administrative or secretarial jobs, lower than in England (11.5%), while 13.0% were in skilled trades (higher than in England as a whole). Relative to England, similar proportions of residents worked in caring, leisure or other service occupations (9.3%) and sales and customer service jobs (7.8%), but there were higher rates of employment as process plant and machine operatives (11.8% against 7.2% nationally) and in elementary occupations (16.0% compared with 11.1% nationally). There was wide variation within the ward; 19.8% of workers on the Stokes Drive estate were in professional jobs, whereas the rate was just 2.6% on some parts of the Jubilee Grove estate; in the same census area, 24.3% of workers were in elementary occupations (compared with 9.9% of workers on the Stokes Drive estate). The census also showed that 23.3% of residents have no qualifications, higher than the national figure (22.5%); 20.4% have a qualification at Level 4 (Certificate of Higher Education) or above, which is a much lower rate than the 27.4% nationally.

Demographics

Population change 
There were 20 families living in Holdingham in 1563, according to the diocesan returns of worshippers. This had increased to 25 families in 1825. The 1801 census recorded 113 residents, which peaked at 198 in 1841. This fell to 143 in 1871, 120 in 1881 and 89 in 1891, before increasing slightly to 95 in 1901. It rose slightly to 101 in 1921 and 107 ten years later, but had dropped back to 75 by 1951. The parish was merged into Sleaford in 1974. Since the 1990s, the hamlet has been incorporated into the built-up area of Sleaford. The modern ward of Sleaford Holdingham (which has different boundaries to former parish) had a total population of 2,774 in 2011; this accounts for 16% of the population of Sleaford (17,671).

Ethnicity, country of origin and religion 
According to the 2011 census, the population of Sleaford Holdingham ward was 97.8% white; 1.3% Asian or Asian British; 0.7% mixed or multi-ethnic; 0.1% black, African, Caribbean or black British; and 0.1% other. 94% of the population were white British and 3.2% were classed as "other white" (neither British, Irish, Gypsy or Irish Traveller). 93.2% of the residents were born in the United Kingdom (88.2% in England), 0.4% in Ireland, 4.1% elsewhere in the European Union (2.7% in post-2001 accession states), and 2.5% in other countries. In 96.2% of households, all people aged over 16 had English as their first language.

In the 2011 census, 69.3% of Sleaford Holdingham's population stated that they were religious and 24.1% stated that they did not follow a religion (the remaining 6.6% not stating a religion). 67.8% of the population were Christian; there were 10 Hindus (0.4%) and 11 Muslims (0.4%), as well as 1 Buddhist, 1 Jew, and 1 Sikh, each making up negligible proportions of the population; 17 people (0.6%) followed other religions.

Household composition, age, health and housing 
In 2011, 49.4% of the ward's population were male and 50.6% female. There were 1,148 households in the ward: 26% single-person households, 67.9% one-family households and 6% other types; 36.9% of households included a married couple or a couple in a same-sex civil partnership, 12.3% a cohabiting couple, and 10.7% a lone parent. 33.9% of households included dependent children (almost half of those were in households with married couples or couples in a same-sex civil partnership). Of all the residents aged over 16, 50.4% were married, 30.3% were single, 10.5% divorced or formerly in a civil partnership, 6% were married, 2.6% separated and 0.2% were in a same-sex civil partnership.

The mean age in the ward in the 2011 census was 38.2 years and the median 39. 21.6% of the ward's residents were under 16, while 14.9% were aged 65 and over. 81.8% of the population reported being in very good or good health and an additional 13.4% reported being in fair health; 83.3% reported that their day-to-day activities were not limited.

According to the 2011 census, a slightly higher proportion of the ward's residents own their own homes with or without a mortgage (64.5%) than in England as a whole (63.3%). At 21.3%, a greater proportion of people in the ward socially rent compared with 17.7% nationally; about three quarters of these people rent from the local authority. 12.8% of residents rent privately, almost all from a private landlord; this is lower than in England as a whole (16.8%). 97.7% of the dwellings in the ward were whole houses or bungalows, with only 2.2% being flats, maisonettes or apartments; most of the dwellings were detached (40.5%) or semi-detached (42%), with a further 15.2% being terraced. There was only one dwelling in the form of a caravan recorded in the 2011 census.

Deprivation 
For measuring deprivation, the Sleaford Holdingham ward is divided into two statistical units called Lower Super Output Areas (LSOAs). The 2010 Indices of Multiple Deprivation showed that the ward contains both the second-most deprived and sixth-least deprived LSOAs in North Kesteven (out of 60 such statistical units). The data from the 2019 update showed that there remained a disparity between the two areas; the LSOA which covered all the lands east of Lincoln Road (excluding part of the Durham Avenue estate and all of the Furlong Way estate) ranked among 40% most deprived LSOAs nationally. By contrast, the LSOA covering the rest of the ward ranked amongst the 20% least deprived areas in the country.

Government and politics

Local government 
Holdingham was a hamlet in the ancient parish of New Sleaford, part of Kesteven's Flaxwell wapentake. It was incorporated into Sleaford Poor Law Union. In 1866, Holdingham was created as a separate civil parish. The Public Health Act 1872 established urban sanitary districts (USD) and Holdingham became part of the Sleaford USD, which in turn was reorganised into Sleaford Urban District (UD) in 1894. Sleaford UD was abolished by the Local Government Act 1972 and, by statutory instrument, Sleaford civil parish became its successor, thus merging Quarrington, New Sleaford, Old Sleaford and Holdingham civil parishes.

Holdingham is served by Sleaford Town Council, North Kesteven District Council and Lincolnshire County Council. On the town council, it forms part of the Sleaford Holdingham ward. Since 1998, Holdingham has also fallen within the Sleaford Holdingham ward in North Kesteven District Council; it is represented by one councillor. The settlement falls within the Lincolnshire County Council ward of Sleaford, which is also represented by one councillor.

National and European politics 
Before 1832, Holdingham was in the Lincolnshire parliamentary constituency. In 1832, the Reform Act divided Lincolnshire. Holdingham was placed in the South Lincolnshire constituency that elected two members to parliament. The constituency was abolished in 1885 and Holdingham was in the new North Kesteven constituency. It merged with the Grantham seat in 1918. In 1995, Quarrington was reorganised into Sleaford and North Hykeham. The member returned in 2019 for Sleaford and North Hykeham was the Conservative candidate Caroline Johnson, who has been the sitting MP since 2016.

Lincolnshire elected a Member of the European Parliament from 1974 until 1994, and then became part of the Lincolnshire and Humberside South constituency until 1999; it then elected members as part of the East Midlands constituency until the United Kingdom withdrew from the European Union in 2020.

Transport 

The A17 road from Newark-on-Trent to King's Lynn bypasses Sleaford from Holdingham Roundabout to Kirkby la Thorpe. It ran through the town until the bypass opened in 1975. The Holdingham roundabout connects the A17 to the A15 road from Peterborough to Scawby. It also passed through Sleaford until 1993, when its bypass was completed.

The nearest railway station is at Sleaford, which is a stop on the Peterborough to Lincoln Line and the Poacher Line, from Grantham to Skegness. Trains from Grantham to London King's Cross take approximately 1 hour 15 minutes.

Education 

The Sleaford Holdingham Ward does not contain any schools or other educational facilities. Education is provided in Sleaford, where there are four primary schools. The nearest are Church Lane School (on Church Lane) and Our Lady of Good Counsel Roman Catholic Primary School (on the Drove); there is also the William Alvey Church of England Primary School on Eastgate and St Botolph's Church of England Primary School in Quarrington. There are also primary schools in the nearby villages of Leasingham, Kirkby la Thorpe and North Rauceby. There are three secondary schools in Sleaford, each with sixth forms: Carre's Grammar School, a boys' grammar school and selective academy; Kesteven and Sleaford High School, a selective academy and girls' grammar school; and St George's Academy (a mixed non-selective comprehensive school and academy). The grammar schools are selective and pupils are required to pass the Eleven plus exam. St George's is not academically selective. The co-educational Sleaford Joint Sixth Form consortium allows pupils to choose subjects taught at all three schools.

Religion 

Holdingham had a chapel in the Middle Ages, which was last in use in the 1550s; it has subsequently disappeared and its location is not known with certainty. As of 2020, Sleaford provides the focus for religious worship. Anglican services normally take place at St Denys' Church, by the town's market place; Holdingham falls within the ecclesiastical parish of New Sleaford. There is a Catholic church (Our Lady of Good Counsel) on Jermyn Street. Sleaford United Reformed Church and the Sleaford Community Church merged in 2008 to form the Sleaford Riverside Church, which meets at premises on Southgate. Sleaford Methodist Church is located on Northgate. New Life Church Ministries have a centre on Mareham Lane. The Salvation Army has a chapel on West Banks. The Sleaford Muslim Community Association has a prayer hall on Station Road. Sleaford Spiritualist Church operates on Westgate.

Historic buildings 

There are seven listed buildings in Holdingham. Three entries are in the hamlet itself: the 17th- or early-18th-century cottage 1, Holdingham; the 18th-century building at 12, Holdingham; and the mid-18th-century buildings at 13 and 14, Holdingham. To the west of the settlement is the 17th- or early 18th-century Anna House Farmhouse and outbuildings. To the farthest west in the former parish boundaries are the late-18th-century Holdingham Farmhouse and adjoining mill buildings. In addition to the listed buildings, several others are recorded as having "local interest", including nos. 3  and 7–11, Holdingham.

Notable residents 
Holdingham gave its name to Richard de Haldingham and Lafford (died 1278) the donor and possible author of the Hereford Mappa Mundi.

References

Notes

Citations

Bibliography
 .
 .
 .
 .
 .
 .
 
 .
 .
 .
 .
 . Archived at the Internet Archive on 17 September 2014.
 
 .
 .
 . Retrieved 10 December 2020.
 .
 
 .

Sleaford